Albert II (died in 1327), a member of the House of Gorizia (Meinhardiner dynasty), ruled as governor of the County of Gorizia from 1323, on behalf of his nephew Count John Henry IV. He inherited from his father only the lands in the Puster Valley.

Life
Albert II was a younger son of Count Albert I of Gorizia and his wife Euphemia, a daughter of the Silesian duke Konrad I of Głogów. He thereby was the younger brother of Henry III, ruling Count of Gorizia upon their father's death in 1304. He inherited only the lands in the Puster Valley. When his brother died in 1323, Albert acted as regent for Henry's minor son John Henry IV.

Albert married Elizabeth, a daughter of Landgrave Henry I of Hesse and, secondly, Euphemia of Mätsch, daughter of bailiff Ulrich II. He was the father of:
 Elizabeth, married Count Herman of Heunburg (d. 1322) and secondly Count William of Schaunberg-Trüchsen
 Catherine, married Ulrich of Waldsee, who was Landeshauptmann of Styria
 Clara, married Herdeggen of Pettau, field marshal of Styria
 Catharina zu Neuhaus, married Ulrich of Taufers at Utenheim
 Albert III (d. 1374)
 Henry IV (d. 1361)
 Meinhard VI (d. 1385)
 Margaret
Albert's three sons succeeded as Counts of Gorizia upon the early death of their cousin John Henry IV in 1338.

References

External links
 Medieval genealogy

Counts of Gorizia
1261 births
1325 deaths
13th-century German nobility
14th-century German nobility